The Ilva is a right tributary of the river Mureș in Transylvania, Romania. It discharges into the Mureș in Lunca Bradului.

Tributaries
The following rivers are tributaries to the river Ilva:

Left: Ilișoara Mare, Unguraș
Right: Negoiu, Pârâul Pietros, Tinul

References

Rivers of Romania
Rivers of Mureș County